The DeWitt Stern Group, Inc. is a privately held, New York City-based insurance brokerage and risk advisory firm. National in scope, the firm also has offices in North White Plains NY, Jersey City NJ, Chicago IL, and in two California locations: San Francisco and Glendale.

Founded in 1899 by DeWitt H. Stern, the firm is led by the founder's grandson, Jolyon F. Stern, who represents the third generation of family ownership.

In 2014, DeWitt Stern Group was acquired by Risk Strategies.

References

Further reading
Jack Roberts, Feb. 2007, "2007 Power Brokers: The Standouts", Risk & Insurance
Erin Gazica, Feb. 2008, "Power Brokers 2008: The 'Total Package' Unwrapped", Risk & Insurance

Financial services companies established in 1899
Insurance companies based in New York City